The Mason Jar was a nightclub and music venue in Phoenix, Arizona. It was known for rock music, alternative rock, punk rock, hip hop, and heavy metal in the 1980s, 1990s and 2000s. Many famous bands such as Nirvana, Rob Zombie, The Ramones, Joan Jett, Stone Temple Pilots, the Red Hot Chili Peppers, Pearl Jam, Tool, The Black Crowes, Los Lobos, Meat Puppets, and many others took the stage during its heyday.

Founder

The Mason Jar was founded in 1979. Early Arizona acts of note included the Spiffs, Blue Shoes, Llory McDonald, and the Schoolboys (later to become Capitol Records recording act Icon). It was founded by Clyde Shields and then sold to Franco Gagliano after a couple of years in business. Gagliano is credited with growing the club and making the small venue a success with national touring bands. Gagliano, originally from Sicily, managed the club from inception until 2000. Gagliano was known for his pizzazz, personality, his clog shoes, and his love-hate relationships with the bands that played at the Mason Jar.

Initial success
Many bands came to the Mason Jar on their way to Sunset Strip in Hollywood, California. Some simply ran out of money, never making it to Los Angeles, and others simply liked Phoenix and decided to stay and made it their permanent home. Whatever the reason for passing through Phoenix, all bands somehow made their way to the Mason Jar and the club became world-renowned in the process. Scores of bands played at the Mason Jar before they made it big, such as Tool, Los Lobos, Green Day, Kid Rock, Rage Against the Machine, Jane's Addiction, Red Hot Chili Peppers, and Guns N' Roses. Local bands such as Billy Clone and the Same,The Beat Angels, Burning Flamingos, The Jetzons, Surgical Steel, Flotsam and Jetsam, Icon, The Results and Sacred Reich also played there. Jason Newsted of Flotsam and Jetsam, who later became the bass player for Metallica, was a regular at the Mason Jar. The Manic Street Preachers were scheduled to play the final gig of their 1995 U.S. tour at the Mason Jar, before the tour was cancelled following the disappearance of Richey Edwards.

Resurgence
The Mason Jar experienced a resurgence as top Phoenix live music venue with the start of the new millennium, when in 2000 the club was bought by local businessman Michael Manfredi aka "Mick". Mick gave The Mason Jar a badly needed face lift, a substantial sound system upgrade and a new contemporary list of rising stars to hit the stage like, Linkin Park, Papa Roach, Fall Out Boy, Jimmy Eat World, Opeth, 30 Seconds to Mars and many more. Mick's appetite for diversity brought The Mason Jar into new genres including country music with acts like David Allan Coe, Hank Williams III and Shooter Jennings. Mick honored The Mason Jar's roots by hosting acts like Megadeth, The Ramones, Rob Halford, Dishwalla, Frank Black, Vanilla Ice, Stephen Pearcy, Ice-T, Robby Krieger and many, many others.

The Mason Jar was a favorite launching ground of music industry execs like Jenna Adler of Creative Artist's Agency (Papa Roach, The Apex Theory) record labels like Sony and DreamWorks, management agencies like Sanctuary Music (Rob Halford) and of concert promoters like Danny Zelisko, owner of “Evening Star Productions” (now merged with Live Nation) Tom Lapenna and Wil Anderson of Lucky Man Concerts, Kim Larowe of 13th Floor Entertainment and many, many more.

On August 15, 2000 Linkin Park played their first live show with singer Chester Bennington at The Mason Jar, just two months before their debut record, Hybrid Theory.

It was not uncommon to see famous artists, professional athletes and politicians at the Mason Jar. Artists like Sammy Hagar and Michael Anthony (Van Halen) would stop in to jam when booked on tour through Phoenix. Local artists like Alice Cooper and Glen Campbell's kids made their debut upon stage at The Mason Jar.

The Mason Jar was often awarded "Top Club for Rock" by the readers of The Phoenix New Times. It gave music fans in Phoenix a chance to experience live bands the way club goers in Los Angeles and other major cities could.

Closing
The Mason Jar closed for business on February 15, 2005 when Mick sold the license to an outside party that no longer operated as The Mason Jar. The Mason Jar experienced its busiest year ever in its last year of business (when Mick was owner), boasting over 30 bands per week and dozens of shows on sale at Ticketmaster every month.

In 2006 the club closed for remodeling and re-opened as a gay bar.

On September 20, 2013 the building was used for the [Legends Of The Mason Jar - One More Time]. 
event. Promoted by Glenn De Jongh, the night featured reunions of many past Mason Jar acts from the 1980s and 1990s. Acts included The Spiffs/Urge, Raven Payne, Schoolboys Again (with members of Icon, King Kobra and Lizzy Borden), Scratch & Sniff, Egomaniacs, Killer Pussy, Blue Shoes, Box Of Cherries/Einsteins & Scott Rowe. Long time owner, Franco introduced the bands.

In 2015, the site of old Mason Jar became a local musical venue once more when Stephen Chilton of Psyko Steve Presents re-opened it as The Rebel Lounge. The first show was The Atlas Moth, Take Over and Destroy, and Gatecreeper. The gay bar has moved and the site is once again promoting all kinds of musical performances. Rebel Lounge is established as a popular venue for emerging musical bands and DJs from all across America.

References

Nightclubs in the United States